Log pri Žužemberku is a small settlement in the Municipality of Trebnje in eastern Slovenia. It lie in the hills north of Žužemberk on the road to Zagorica. The area is part of the historical region of Lower Carniola. The municipality is now included in the Southeast Slovenia Statistical Region.

Name
The name of the settlement was changed from Log to Log pri Žužemberku in 1953.

References

External links

Log pri Žužemberku at Geopedia

Populated places in the Municipality of Trebnje